Wards Pass,  above sea level, is an alpine pass in the Rachel Range of the Inland Kaikoura Ranges of New Zealand's northern South Island. It lies between the valleys of the upper Acheron and Awatere rivers and was discovered by the surveyor Joseph Ward and his brother-in-law, Cyrus Goulter, in March 1847.

The HVDC Inter-Island line transverses the pass on its route between Benmore Dam and the Cook Strait cable terminal at Fighting Bay in the Marlborough Sounds.

References

Mountain passes of New Zealand
Landforms of the Marlborough Region